The Molalla River State Park is located in U.S. state of Oregon. It is a few miles north of Canby, and half a mile from the Canby Ferry. The park is south of the Willamette River and east of the Molalla River, at the confluence of the Pudding, Molalla and Willamette rivers.  The Pudding River flows into the Molalla from the west, just before the Molalla joins the Willamette.  The floodplains of these rivers provide important habitat for waterfowl, wading birds, deer, small mammals, reptiles and amphibians. A blue heron rookery, one of the largest in the Willamette Valley, is located in Molalla River State Park.

Gallery

See also
 List of Oregon state parks
 List of rivers in Oregon

References

External links
 
Pudding River Watershed Council

State parks of Oregon
Parks in Clackamas County, Oregon